In botany, a drupe (or stone fruit) is an indehiscent fruit in which an outer fleshy part (exocarp, or skin, and mesocarp, or flesh) surrounds a single shell (the pit, stone, or pyrena) of hardened endocarp with a seed (kernel) inside.  These fruits usually develop from a single carpel, and mostly from flowers with superior ovaries (polypyrenous drupes are exceptions). 

The definitive characteristic of a drupe is that the hard, lignified stone is derived from the ovary wall of the flower. In an aggregate fruit, which is composed of small, individual drupes (such as a raspberry), each individual is termed a drupelet, and may together form an aggregate fruit. Such fruits are often termed berries, although botanists use a different definition of berry. Other fleshy fruits may have a stony enclosure that comes from the seed coat surrounding the seed, but such fruits are not drupes.

Flowering plants that produce drupes include coffee, jujube, mango, olive, most palms (including açaí, date, sabal and oil palms), pistachio, white sapote, cashew, and all members of the genus Prunus, including the almond, apricot, cherry, damson, peach, nectarine, and plum.

The term drupaceous is applied to a fruit having the structure and texture of a drupe, but which does not precisely fit the definition of a drupe.

Terminology
The boundary between a drupe and a berry is not always clear. Thus, some sources describe the fruit of species from the genus Persea, which includes the avocado, as a drupe, others describe avocado fruit as a berry. In marginal cases, terms such as drupaceous or drupe-like may be used.

The term stone fruit (also stonefruit) can be a synonym for drupe or, more typically, it can mean just the fruit of the genus Prunus.

Freestone refers to a drupe having a stone which can be removed from the flesh with ease. The flesh is not attached to the stone and does not need to be cut to free the stone. Freestone varieties of fruits are preferred for uses that require careful removal of the stone, especially if removal will be done by hand. Freestone plums are preferred for making homegrown prunes, and freestone sour cherries are preferred for making pies and cherry soup.

Clingstone refers to a drupe having a stone which cannot be easily removed from the flesh. The flesh is attached strongly to the stone and must be cut to free the stone. Clingstone varieties of fruits in the genus Prunus are preferred as table fruit and for jams, because the flesh of clingstone fruits tends to be more tender and juicy throughout.

Tryma is a specialized term for such nut-like drupes that are difficult to categorize. Hickory nuts (Carya) and walnuts (Juglans) in the Juglandaceae family grow within an outer husk; these fruits are technically drupes or drupaceous nuts, thus are not true botanical nuts.

Ecology
Many drupes, with their sweet, fleshy outer layer, attract the attention of animals as a food, and the plant population benefits from the resulting dispersal of its seeds. The endocarp (pit or stone) is sometimes dropped after the fleshy part is eaten, but is often swallowed, passing through the digestive tract, and returned to the soil in feces with the seed inside unharmed. This passage through the digestive tract can reduce the thickness of the endocarp, thus can aid in germination rates. The process is known as scarification.

Examples
Typical drupes include apricots, olives, loquat, peaches, plums, cherries, mangoes, pecans, and amlas (Indian gooseberries). Other examples include sloe (Prunus spinosa) and ivy (Hedera helix).

The coconut is also a drupe, but the mesocarp is fibrous or dry (termed a husk), so this type of fruit is classified as a simple dry, fibrous drupe. Unlike other drupes, the coconut seed is so large that it is unlikely to be dispersed by being swallowed by fauna, but it can float extremely long distances—across oceans.

Bramble fruits such as the blackberry and the raspberry are aggregates of drupelets.  The fruit of blackberries and raspberries comes from a single flower whose pistil is made up of a number of free carpels. However, mulberries, which closely resemble blackberries, are not aggregate fruit, but are multiple fruits, actually derived from bunches of catkins, each drupelet thus belonging to a different flower.

Certain drupes occur in large clusters, as in the case of palm species, where a large array of drupes is found in a cluster. Examples of such large drupe clusters include dates, Jubaea chilensis in central Chile and Washingtonia filifera in the Sonoran Desert of North America.

Drupe-like "fruits" are also known in many gymnosperms like cycads, ginkgos and some cypresses.

Gallery

See also
 Pome (polypyrenous drupe)

References

External links

 Identification Of Major Fruit Types
 Fruits Called Nuts
 

 
Edible nuts and seeds
Fruit morphology